State Road 827 (SR 827) is a northeast–southwest State Road located in Steuben County, Indiana, United States, in the northeastern part of the state. The highway runs from the City of Angola northeast to SR 120 in Fremont. The highway was formed in the 1930s, as an alternative for traffic between Toledo, Ohio and Angola. A section of roadway was authorized as SR 827, but later became part of SR 120. A small realignment project was completed in Angola during the 2000s.

Route description
SR 827 starts in Angola at the corner of Wayne Street (SR 127) and Harcourt Road. It follows Harcourt Road east-southeasterly, over Indiana Northeastern Railroad track, until it reaches Williams Street. The highway follows Williams Street northeasterly until it leaves the City of Angola, where the Williams Street name ends. SR 827 roughly parallels the Indiana Northeastern Railroad on its way to Fremont. South of Fremont the state road passes below the Indiana Toll Road. SR 827 enters Fremont traveling on Wayne Street, crossing back over the Indiana Northeastern Railroad track. The state highway designation for SR 827 terminates at an intersection with Toledo Street (SR 120) where Wayne Street continues north, towards Michigan.

History
The Indiana State Highway Commission proposed a state road following modern SR 827 in 1932, continuing north to Michigan east of Ray. SR 827 was commissioned in 1934 between Angola and Fremont. At this time SR 827 was authorized between Fremont and Michigan State Line, east of Fremont. In the same year the Tri-State Scenic Highway was founded, running between Toledo, Ohio and Angola via of Fremont. The Tri-State Scenic Highway was planned to relieve traffic on US 20 and in the state of Indiana it became part of the state road system as SR 827. Steuben County had purchased most right of way needed for the Tri-State Scenic Highway by mid-1935. When all right of way was secured the Indiana State Highway Commission was to take control of the Tri-State Scenic Highway. The state highway commission built the section of road east of Fremont in 1936. During 1939 the section of road that was authorized as SR 827, between Fremont and Michigan, became part of SR 120 as it was commissioned between Bristol and Michigan. The entire route of SR 827 was paved by 1962. In Angola, it was diverted over a recently completed bridge in 2005 so that it intersects SR 127 just north of Angola.

Major intersections

See also

 List of state roads in Indiana
 List of highways numbered 827

References

 Indiana Department of Natural Resources, "Underground Railroad Sites: Fremont", accessed August 24, 2009.
 McClew, Maurice (1956) "The Underground Railroad in Steuben County", Harvey Morley, editor, The 1955 History, Complete County Atlas, pictorial and Biographical Album of Steuben County, Indiana, Angola, Indiana, pp. 352–354.
 Sauer, Lee "Freedom Trail: The Underground Railroad ran through northeast Indiana, KPC News.net, accessed August 18, 2008.

External links

827
Transportation in Steuben County, Indiana